is a Japanese manga series written by Lynn Okamoto and illustrated by Mengo Yokoyari. It was irregularly serialized in Shueisha's Weekly Young Jump, Miracle Jump and Young Jump Gold manga magazines from January 2012 to August 2017, and compiled into two tankōbon volumes by Shueisha.

Plot
Akira Saitou was a close friend with tomboyish Subaru Kawana when they're kids but Subaru was forced to study in a prestigious private high school because of her family's rich status. Akira followed his childhood friend and managed to enter the same high school as Subaru by a special scholarship plan. Even though he reunites with Subaru, she has grown into a talented and beautiful woman and has become a distant existence for him. Subaru keeps a cold attitude towards Akira but he wants to somehow shorten the distance between them.
Akira troubled with Subaru's cold attitude, remembers a mistakenly overheard conversation of some girls in which they're talking about a God named "Ura no Kamisama" who fulfill your wish if you cast a spell and say a wish, in exchange of something. He muttered the spell and wishes that his room will connect to Subaru's and his wish magically comes true. He later found that Subaru actually wished the same thing as him, and "Self-control" of a person is the price at which the wish comes true. But Subaru wished earlier than him so only she loses her self-control for one hour per day. Akira and Subaru are forced to live together due to their room being connected. In spite of that, Subaru doesn't show any signs like she is compromising. Subaru sees him with cold eyes like watching an insect. However, when Subaru's self restraint was taken her usual cold attitude starting to looks like a lie to Akira.

Publication
Kimi wa Midara na Boku no Joō is written by Lynn Okamoto and illustrated by Mengo Yokoyari. Two one-shot chapters were published in Weekly Young Jump on January 19 and June 21, 2012. It was then serialized in Miracle Jump from August 16 to December 27, 2012. The manga was irregularly published in Weekly Young Jump in 2013: on February 4; on August 8; August 22; and November 14. A 8-page extra chapter was published in Miracle Jump on March 17, 2015. Another chapter was published in Weekly Young Jump on February 25, 2016. A chapter was published in Young Jump Gold on May 18, 2017. Its last chapter was published in Weekly Young Jump on August 31, 2017. Shueisha collected its chapters in two tankōbon volumes, released on February 19, 2013, and November 17, 2017.

Volume list

Reception
The manga was ranked 1st within best selling manga's in February, 2013. As of November 2013, the series had over 170,000 copies in circulation. As of August 2017, the manga had over 260,000 copies in circulation.

References

External links
 Kimi wa Midara na Boku no Joō official website at Young Jump  
 

Seinen manga
Sex comedy anime and manga
Shueisha manga